Leonardo DiCaprio is an American actor who began his career performing as a child on television. He appeared on the shows The New Lassie (1989) and Santa Barbara (1990) and also had long running roles in the comedy-drama Parenthood (1990) and the sitcom Growing Pains (1991). DiCaprio played Tobias "Toby" Wolff opposite Robert De Niro in the biographical coming-of-age drama This Boy's Life in 1993. In the same year, he had a supporting role as a developmentally disabled boy Arnie Grape in What's Eating Gilbert Grape, which earned him nominations for the Academy Award for Best Supporting Actor and the Golden Globe Award for Best Supporting Actor – Motion Picture. In 1995, DiCaprio played the leading roles of an American author Jim Carroll in The Basketball Diaries and the French poet Arthur Rimbaud in Total Eclipse. The following year he played Romeo Montague in the Baz Luhrmann-directed film Romeo + Juliet (1996). DiCaprio starred with Kate Winslet in the James Cameron-directed film Titanic (1997). The film became the highest grossing at the worldwide box-office, and made him famous globally. For his performance as Jack Dawson, he received the MTV Movie Award for Best Male Performance and his first nomination for the Golden Globe Award for Best Actor – Motion Picture Drama.

In 2002, DiCaprio played con-artist Frank Abagnale, Jr. opposite Tom Hanks in the Steven Spielberg-directed biographical crime-drama Catch Me If You Can and also starred in the Martin Scorsese-directed historical drama Gangs of New York. He founded his own production company, Appian Way, in 2004. The next two films he starred in were both directed by Scorsese: the Howard Hughes biopic The Aviator (2004) and the crime drama The Departed (2006). For his portrayal of Hughes in the former, DiCaprio won the Golden Globe Award for Best Actor – Motion Picture Drama and garnered his first nomination for the Academy Award for Best Actor.

DiCaprio produced the environmental documentary The 11th Hour and the comedy drama Gardener of Eden in 2007. The following year, he reunited with Kate Winslet in the Sam Mendes-directed drama Revolutionary Road and appeared in the Ridley Scott-directed action film Body of Lies. DiCaprio reteamed with Scorsese in 2010 in the psychological thriller Shutter Island and also starred in the Christopher Nolan-directed science fiction heist thriller Inception. In 2011, he portrayed J. Edgar Hoover, the first director of the FBI, in the biopic J. Edgar. The following year, he played a supporting role in the Quentin Tarantino-directed western Django Unchained. DiCaprio starred in two film adaptations of novels in 2013; he first appeared as Jay Gatsby in the Luhrmann-directed adaptation of F. Scott Fitzgerald's novel The Great Gatsby, and later as Jordan Belfort in The Wolf of Wall Street, an adaptation of Belfort's memoir of the same name. The latter earned him a third Academy Award nomination for Best Actor and a Golden Globe Award for Best Actor – Motion Picture Musical or Comedy. In 2015, DiCaprio played fur trapper Hugh Glass in the survival drama The Revenant, for which he won the Academy Award for Best Actor.

Film

As actor

As producer

Television

Notes

See also
 List of awards and nominations received by Leonardo DiCaprio

References

External links
 
 

Male actor filmographies
American filmographies